Euphaedra asteria is a butterfly in the family Nymphalidae. It is found in the Republic of the Congo.

References

Butterflies described in 1993
Asteria
Endemic fauna of the Republic of the Congo
Butterflies of Africa